Eilema gracilipennis is a moth of the  subfamily Arctiinae. It was described by Wallengren in 1860. It is found in the Democratic Republic of Congo, Kenya, South Africa and Uganda.

References

gracilipennis
Moths described in 1860
Moths of Africa